Elections to Leicestershire County Council took place on 4 June 2009, having been delayed from 7 May, in order to coincide with elections to the European Parliament. A total of 55 councillors were elected from 52 electoral divisions across the county's 7 districts. The Conservatives held control of the council and increased their majority from 5 to 17 seats after gaining many seats from Labour who lost 70% of their seats. The BNP fielded many more candidates than at the last election which caused their vote share to increase dramatically.

Results

|}

Division results
Results for individual divisions are shown below. They have been divided into their respective Districts or Boroughs and listed alphabetically.

District of Blaby

Borough of Charnwood

The Conservative councillor for Syston Ridgeway died on Thursday 18 August 2011. A by-election was held on 3 November 2011 and was won by Stephen John Hampson.

References

2009 English local elections
2009
2000s in Leicestershire